Varg is a German metal band from Coburg, Bavaria. The band's name means "wolf" in Swedish. The band's songs deal mainly with paganism and Nordic mythology.

History 

Varg was formed in 2005 in Coburg, Bavaria, by guitarist Philipp "Freki" Seiler and drummer Silvester "Fenrier" Grundmann. They were joined by bassist Nivel, vocalist Frost and guitarist Da'ath. They are also known for issuing a cease and desist letter to a Swedish techno artist of the same name in 2019.

Discography

Demos 
 2006: Donareiche

Studio albums 
 2007: Wolfszeit (Heiden Klangwerke)
 2008: Schildfront (Split with Minas Morgul)
 2008: Live am Wolfszeit Festival (Live album)
 2010: Blutaar (NoiseArt Records)
 2011: Wolfskult (NoiseArt Records)
 2012: Guten Tag (NoiseArt Records)
 2016: Das Ende aller Lügen (Napalm Records)
 2019: Wolfszeit II (Wolf Metal Records)
 2020: Zeichen (Napalm Records)

EPs 
 2012: Legacy
 2015: Rotkäppchen (Napalm Records)
 2017: Götterdämmerung (Napalm Records)

References

External links 

 
 

Musical groups established in 2005
German metalcore musical groups
German melodic death metal musical groups